USC&GS Yukon was a steamer that served as a survey ship in the United States Coast and Geodetic Survey from 1898 to 1923. She was the second and last Coast and Geodetic Survey ship to bear the name.

Construction and characteristics 

Yukon was built under a contract let 9 April 1898 to Gas Engine & Power Company and Charles L. Seabury Company, Morris Heights, Bronx, New York, for building the ship in components suitable for shipping under the supervision of Assistant J. F. Pratt. The components were shipped by rail to Seattle, Washington, and then to St. Michael, Territory of Alaska, arriving there on 3 July 1898.  A survey team under Assistant Pratt had been waiting at St. Michael for her to arrive since 29 June 1898, and on 11 July 1898 enough material was on shore for them to begin laying Yukon′s keel. Approximately twenty men assembled her. Work on Yukon was delayed when the assembly team was diverted to make repairs to the Coast and Geodetic Survey survey steamer USC&GS Taku, which had arrived at St. Michael in a "disabled condition," but Yukon nonetheless was completed and launched on 20 August 1898, only 41 days after her keel had been laid and after only 29 days of actual work to assemble her. Yukon was commissioned immediately.

Service history 
With all equipment and stores loaded aboard Yulon by 23 August 1898, "at 2:15 a.m. she started for the mouth of the Kwiklok by way of the Aproon Mouth" for surveys. From the Aproon Mouth she towed a scow with the survey party's camping outfit to the Kwiklok, where she arrived 26 August 1898. After a brief stay on the survey grounds all vessels, including Yukon, headed to St. Michael on 10 September 1898 for winter storage. After arrival on 13 September 1898, Yukon, Taku, two steam launches, the scow, and eight "pulling boats" were housed for the winter. The survey party embarked on the United States Navy gunboat  for transportation to Seattle.

In the summer of 1912, Yukon rendered assistance to the inhabitants of Kodiak on Kodiak Island following an eruption of Mount Katmai. Tragedy struck her in November 1916 when a member of her crew, watchman F. A. Paul, was lost by probable drowning at King Cove on the Alaska Peninsula.

After serving exclusively in Alaskan waters, Yukon was retired from Coast and Geodetic Survey service in 1923.

Notes

References

NOAA History, A Science Odyssey: Tools of the Trade: Ships: Coast and Geodetic Survey Ships: Yukon
NOAA History, A Science Odyssey: Hall of Honor: Lifesaving and the Protection of Property by the Coast & Geodetic Survey 1845-1937
NOAA History, A Science Odyssey: Hall of Honor: In the Line of Duty 1846-1936

Ships of the United States Coast and Geodetic Survey
Survey ships of the United States
Ships built in Morris Heights, Bronx
Ships built in Alaska
1898 ships
Alaska-related ships